NGC 1281 is a compact elliptical galaxy located about 200 million light-years away in the constellation Perseus. NGC 1281 was discovered by astronomer John Dreyer on December 12, 1876. It is a member of the Perseus Cluster.

Like NGC 1277 and NGC 1271, NGC 1281 is a candidate "relic galaxy".

Supermassive black hole
The supermassive black hole in NGC 1281 has an estimated mass of about 10 billion  solar masses ( M☉). However,  Anna Ferré-Mateu et al. estimated the black hole has a mass of no more than 5 billion solar masses.

See also
 List of NGC objects (1001–2000)
 NGC 1271
 NGC 1277

Notes 
1.This value was determined by using the given half-light radius.

References

External links

Perseus Cluster
Perseus (constellation)
Elliptical galaxies
1281
12458
Astronomical objects discovered in 1876